John Browning (29 November 1888 – 14 November 1964) was a Scottish footballer who played for Celtic, winning four league titles with the club. He is also remembered for his bribery charges in the early part of the 20th century.

Career

Club
Browning played for local clubs Glasgow Perthshire, Bonhill Hibs, Vale of Leven, and Dumbarton Harp before arriving at Parkhead in 1911. He was loaned back to his two previous teams during his first year at the club.

He made his league debut for Celtic in a 1–0 victory over Third Lanark at Cathkin Park on 2 November 1912. He was a winger who played with a straightforward, forceful attacking flair which led to plenty of goals. In seven years with Celtic he managed to score a goal every three games, including 15 from 38 league matches during the 1914–15 season. He won four Scottish League titles in consecutive years, from 1914 to 1917 (the league continued during World War I).

He moved to Chelsea in June 1919 where he made just five league appearances, before signing for Vale of Leven in June 1920, and then Dumbarton in September 1920; in 1922 he went back to Vale of Leven again (the club now having re-joined the SFL) for two more years.

International
On 28 February 1914, Browning made his first and only appearance for Scotland, in a goalless draw against Wales at Celtic Park. He represented the Scottish League XI twice, again in 1914 and was also selected to play for the Glasgow FA against Sheffield in the same year.

Personal life
In 1924, he and Archie Kyle, a former Rangers player, were found guilty of attempting to bribe Bo'ness player Peter Brown in a public house in Glasgow's Dundas Street: both men were sentenced to 60 days' hard labour.

Browning's son of the same name was also a footballer; in addition to playing for Liverpool he also appeared for Dumbarton.

References 

Sources
Celtic: A complete record 1888-1992 by Paul Lunney

1888 births
1964 deaths
Sportspeople from Dumbarton
Footballers from West Dunbartonshire
Dumbarton Harp F.C. players
Glasgow Perthshire F.C. players
Scottish Junior Football Association players
Celtic F.C. players
Chelsea F.C. players
Dumbarton F.C. players
Vale of Leven F.C. players
Scottish footballers
Scotland international footballers
Scottish Football League players
English Football League players
Scottish Football League representative players
Association football wingers
20th-century Scottish criminals
People convicted of bribery
Sportspeople convicted of crimes